Peter James Green, FRS (born 28 April 1950) is a British Bayesian statistician. He is Emeritus Professor and Professorial Research Fellow at the University of Bristol, and a professor at the University of Technology, Sydney. He is distinguished for his contributions to computational statistics, in particular his contributions to spatial statistics and semi-parametric regression models and also his development of reversible-jump Markov chain Monte Carlo.

Education and career 
Green was born in Solihull and attended Solihull School. He studied mathematics at Oxford University before moving to the University of Sheffield for postgraduate study, where he was awarded an MSc in probability and statistics and a PhD in applied probability.

Honors and awards 
Green was elected a Fellow of the Royal Society in 2003. He served as president of the Royal Statistical Society from 2001 to 2003, having  previously been awarded its Guy Medal in both Bronze (1987) and Silver (1999). He held a Royal Society Wolfson Research Merit Award from 2006 to 2011. He was president of the International Society for Bayesian Analysis for the year 2007.

He is editor of the journal Statistical Science for 2014–2016.

References

British statisticians
Bayesian statisticians
Fellows of the Royal Society
Academics of the University of Bristol
Living people
Presidents of the Royal Statistical Society
1950 births
Royal Society Wolfson Research Merit Award holders
Fellows of the Institute of Mathematical Statistics
Computational statisticians
Alumni of the University of Sheffield